Burnum (or Burnum Municipium), an archaeological site, was a Roman Legion camp and town. It is located 2.5 km north of Kistanje, in inland Dalmatia, Croatia. The remains include a praetorium, the foundations of several rooms, the amphitheatre and the aqueduct.

Burnum is also popularly called Hollow Church (Šuplja Crkva) and is one of many ruins in the Balkans identified in folklore as Traianus' Town (Trojanov Grad). Only two of the original five arches have been preserved (at the end of the 18th century Alberto Fortis mentioned three of them).

History

The Roman writer Plinius wrote about Burnum as "fortress distinguished in wars." - "In hoc tractu sunt Burnum, Andetrium, Tribulium nobilitata proeliis castella." The Pagana chart from the 16th century presented marked traits of Burnum as the ancient locality, but it did not reach archeological interest until the 19th century, when it occupied the attention of renowned Croatian archaeologists, father Lujo Marun and father Frane Bulić. The first excavations were conducted by Austrian archaeologists.

It is assumed that Burnum originates from the year 33 BC, but it is more likely that it was established a few decades later. Several Roman legions were located there in succession, and the first one was Legio XX Valeria Victrix from the beginning of the Pannonian uprising (Bellum Batonianum) in AD 6-9. The reason for its location was the need for the control of traffic around the Krka River. Building was initiated by the Roman governor for Dalmatia Publius Cornelius Dolabella and continued by the Emperor Claudius.

The camp gained its final shape during the reign of Claudius around 50 AD. Legio XI Claudia Pia Fidelis left the camp some time between AD 42 and 67, probably AD 56-57 and was succeeded by Legio IIII Flavia Felix.

According to some sources, a rebellion of Lucius Arruntius Camillus Scribonianus against the emperor Claudius in AD 42 was started at this camp as well. After the last Roman legions had left the camp, it developed into an urban settlement.

The camp was completely destroyed when the emperor Justinian attempted to take it back from the Ostrogoths in the 6th century.

The military amphitheatre at Burnum is estimated to have been able to accommodate 6,000 spectators. It had four entrances and used the natural terrain, being cut into the bedrock of the karst by soldiers from Legio XI, but it was later turned over to civilian use. Coins found there enable parts to be dated to the reign of the Emperor Claudius. The amphitheatre eventually collapsed through disuse and neglect.

Aqueduct

The Plavno Polje is an entirely underground aqueduct, so that water stayed cool in the summer and could not freeze in the winter. It is about 32.6 kilometers long. 170m height-difference are between the source and the town. It flowed 86 liters per second.

The location is only partially archaeologically investigated. A pre-Roman Liburnian builder can not be excluded at the moment in accordance with previous studies.

Legends

There are two old legends about the construction of this aqueduct. The first story is:

Two men courted a woman. One man should build a town, the other man should build an aqueduct to this town. And who would be first, he would receive her as his wife. Both done simultaneously, but that one, who had built the town, judged, that his town was not finished yet, and so the other one should marry her. With the earth, which was dugged out at the building of the aqueduct, was built a hill and on the hill a village. The name of that one, who built the aqueduct, was Rade and so is the village also called Radučka glavica.

Another old legend about this aqueduct is:

Selemnus, a beautiful young shepherd in those parts, was beloved by Argyra, the Nymph, from whom the town and fountain of that name were called; but the flower of his age being over, the Nymph deserted him, upon which he pined away, and was transformed into a river by Venus; after this he still retained his former passion, and for some time conveyed his waters, through a subterraneous passage, to Argyra's fountain. And because they both had separated, but those story was never forgotten, the names remained in memory in Argyra and Selemnos near Korinth and in Argyruntum and Zrmanja. So the aqueduct stayed in memory. The major harbour of Liburnian navy since 5th century BC was Corynthia at eastern cape of Krk island.

References

Literature 
 Marin Buovac: O natpisnoj građi rimskih amfteatara na prostoru istočnojadranske obale / On the inscriptions of Roman amphitheatres in the Eastern Adriatic seaboard, Vjesnik za arheologiju i povijest dalmatinsku, Vol. 105, No. 1, 2012.
 Marin Buovac: Duhovni svijet i božanstva gladijatora u sklopu rimskih amfiteatara na tlu današnje Hrvatske / The spiritual world and deities of gladiators in Roman amphitheatres in the territory of present-day Croatia, Vjesnik Arheološkog muzeja u Zagrebu, Vol. 46 - 2014., str. 135 - 157.
 Marin Buovac: Rimski amfiteatri na tlu istočnog Jadrana i zaobalja / Römische Amphitheater auf dem ostadriatischen Gebiet und Hinterland, Histria Antiqua, vol. 22, Pula, 2013., str. 129 - 156.

Illyrian Croatia
Archaeology of Illyria
Archaeological sites in Croatia
Roman towns and cities in Croatia
Former populated places in the Balkans
History of Dalmatia
Roman legionary fortresses in Croatia
Roman fortifications in Roman Dalmatia
Buildings and structures in Šibenik-Knin County
Tourist attractions in Šibenik-Knin County